In algebraic geometry, a branch of mathematics, Serre duality is a duality for the coherent sheaf cohomology of algebraic varieties, proved by Jean-Pierre Serre. The basic version applies to vector bundles on a smooth projective variety, but Alexander Grothendieck found wide generalizations, for example to singular varieties. On an n-dimensional variety, the theorem says that a cohomology group  is the dual space of another one, . Serre duality is the analog for coherent sheaf cohomology of Poincaré duality in topology, with the canonical line bundle replacing the orientation sheaf.

The Serre duality theorem is also true in complex geometry more generally, for compact complex manifolds that are not necessarily projective complex algebraic varieties. In this setting, the Serre duality theorem is an application of Hodge theory for Dolbeault cohomology, and may be seen as a result in the theory of elliptic operators.

These two different interpretations of Serre duality coincide for non-singular projective complex algebraic varieties, by an application of Dolbeault's theorem relating sheaf cohomology to Dolbeault cohomology.

Serre duality for vector bundles

Algebraic theorem
Let X be a smooth variety of dimension n over a field k. Define the canonical line bundle  to be the bundle of n-forms on X, the top exterior power of the cotangent bundle:

Suppose in addition that X is proper (for example, projective) over k. Then Serre duality says: for an algebraic vector bundle E on X and an integer i, there is a natural isomorphism

of finite-dimensional k-vector spaces. Here  denotes the tensor product of vector bundles. It follows that the dimensions of the two cohomology groups are equal:

As in Poincaré duality, the isomorphism in Serre duality comes from the cup product in sheaf cohomology.

The trace map is the analog for coherent sheaf cohomology of integration in de Rham cohomology.

Differential-geometric theorem
Serre also proved the same duality statement for X a compact complex manifold and E a holomorphic vector bundle.
Here, the Serre duality theorem is a consequence of Hodge theory. Namely, on a compact complex manifold  equipped with a Riemannian metric, there is a Hodge star operator

where . Additionally, since  is complex, there is a splitting of the complex differential forms into forms of type . The Hodge star operator (extended complex-linearly to complex-valued differential forms) interacts with this grading as

Notice that the holomorphic and anti-holomorphic indices have switched places.

Using the conjugate-linear Hodge star, one may define a Hermitian -inner product on complex differential forms, by

Furthermore, suppose  is a Hermitian holomorphic vector bundle. Defining , one obtains an isomorphism

where  consists of smooth -valued complex differential forms.

The Hodge theorem for Dolbeault cohomology asserts that if we define

On the left is Dolbeault cohomology, and on the right is the vector space of harmonic -valued differential forms defined by

Using this description, the Serre duality theorem can be stated as follows: The isomorphism  induces a complex linear isomorphism

This can be easily proved using the Hodge theory above.

with equality if and only if . In particular, the complex linear pairing

The statement of Serre duality in the algebraic setting may be recovered by taking , and applying Dolbeault's theorem, which states that

where on the left is Dolbeault cohomology and on the right sheaf cohomology, where  denotes the sheaf of holomorphic -forms. In particular, we obtain

Algebraic curves
A fundamental application of Serre duality is to algebraic curves. (Over the complex numbers, it is equivalent to consider compact Riemann surfaces.) Serre duality describes the  group in terms of an  group (for a different line bundle). That is more concrete, since  of a line bundle is simply its space of sections.

Serre duality is especially relevant to the Riemann–Roch theorem for curves. For a line bundle L of degree d on a curve X of genus g, the Riemann–Roch theorem says that

Using Serre duality, this can be restated in more elementary terms:

The latter statement (expressed in terms of divisors) is in fact the original version of the theorem from the 19th century. This is the main tool used to analyze how a given curve can be embedded into projective space and hence to classify algebraic curves.

Example: Every global section of a line bundle of negative degree is zero. When the genus g is at least 2, it follows by Serre duality that . Here  is the first-order deformation space of X. This is the basic calculation needed to show that the moduli space of curves of genus g has dimension .

Serre duality for coherent sheaves
Another formulation of Serre duality holds for all coherent sheaves, not just vector bundles. As a first step in generalizing Serre duality, Grothendieck showed that this version works for schemes with mild singularities, Cohen–Macaulay schemes, not just smooth schemes.

Namely, for a Cohen–Macaulay scheme X of pure dimension n over a field k, Grothendieck defined a coherent sheaf  on X called the dualizing sheaf. (Some authors call this sheaf .) Suppose in addition that X is proper over k. For a coherent sheaf E on X and an integer i, Serre duality says that there is a natural isomorphism

of finite-dimensional k-vector spaces. Here the Ext group is taken in the abelian category of -modules. This includes the previous statement, since  is isomorphic to  when E is a vector bundle.

In order to use this result, one has to determine the dualizing sheaf explicitly, at least in special cases. When X is smooth over k,  is the canonical line bundle  defined above. More generally,  if X is a Cohen–Macaulay subscheme of codimension r in a smooth scheme Y over k, then the dualizing sheaf can be described as an Ext sheaf:

When X is a local complete intersection of codimension r in a smooth scheme Y, there is a more elementary description: the normal bundle of X in Y is a vector bundle of rank r, and the dualizing sheaf of X is given by

In this case, X is a Cohen–Macaulay scheme with  a line bundle, which says that X is Gorenstein.

Example: Let X be a complete intersection in projective space  over a field k, defined by homogeneous polynomials  of degrees . (To say that this is a complete intersection means that X has dimension .) Then the dualizing sheaf of X is the line bundle

by the adjunction formula.

Complex moduli of Calabi–Yau threefolds 
Of course, the last statement depends on the Bogomolev–Tian–Todorov theorem which states every deformation on a Calabi–Yau is unobstructed.

Grothendieck duality

Grothendieck's theory of coherent duality is a broad generalization of Serre duality, using the language of derived categories. For any scheme X of finite type over a field k, there is an object  of the bounded derived category of coherent sheaves on X, called the dualizing complex of X over k. Formally,  is the exceptional inverse image , where f is the given morphism . In particular, when X is smooth over k,  is the canonical line bundle placed in degree −n.

Using the dualizing complex, Serre duality generalizes to any proper scheme X over k. Namely, there is a natural isomorphism of finite-dimensional k-vector spaces

Here the tensor product means the derived tensor product, as is natural in derived categories.

Serre duality holds more generally for proper algebraic spaces over a field.

Notes

References

External links

Topological methods of algebraic geometry
Complex manifolds
Duality theories